Polytechnic University Station, is a station on Line 6 of the Wuhan Metro. It entered revenue service on December 28, 2016. It is located in Dongxihu District and it serves the Wuhan Polytechnic University.

Station layout

References

Wuhan Metro stations
Line 6, Wuhan Metro
Railway stations in China opened in 2016